Fatehgarh, Uttar Pradesh, India derives its name from an old fort. Fatehgarh remained a military station of considerable importance and in 1802 it became the headquarters of the Governor General's Agent for the ceded provinces. In 1818 a gun carriage factory was established here.

Forts in Uttar Pradesh
Farrukhabad district